The Administration Buildings are a historic site in Boca Raton, Florida, United States. They are located at 2 East Camino Real. On June 27, 1985, they were added to the U.S. National Register of Historic Places.

Built by Addison Mizner as his administration and sales office while he was developing Boca Raton in the 1920s, in 2018 it is the site of a wedding and event venue.

References

External links

 Palm Beach County listings at National Register of Historic Places
 Palm Beach County listings at Florida's Office of Cultural and Historical Programs
 The Addison official site

Addison Mizner buildings
National Register of Historic Places in Palm Beach County, Florida
Spanish Colonial Revival architecture in Florida
Buildings and structures in Boca Raton, Florida
1925 establishments in Florida
Buildings and structures completed in 1925